The Peel Sessions is an album by Irish band Thin Lizzy, released in 1994. This album consists of a series of recordings made for BBC Radio 1, and originally broadcast on the John Peel show.

Track listing
 "Whiskey in the Jar" (Trad. arr. Eric Bell, Brian Downey, Phil Lynott) - 5:52
 "Rosalie" (Bob Seger) - 3:18
 "Suicide" (Lynott) - 5:20
 "Emerald" (Lynott, Downey, Scott Gorham, Brian Robertson) - 3:59
 "Cowboy Song" (Lynott, Downey) - 5:13
 "Jailbreak" (Lynott) - 4:06
 "Don't Believe a Word" (Lynott) - 2:48
 "Little Darling" (Lynott) - 3:07
 "Still in Love With You"  (Lynott) - 5:38
 "Vagabond of the Western World" (Lynott) - 4:27
 "Little Girl in Bloom" (Lynott) - 4:42
 "Killer Without a Cause" (Gorham, Lynott) - 3:41
 "Bad Reputation" (Downey, Gorham, Lynott) - 2:49
 "That Woman's Gonna Break Your Heart" (Lynott) - 3:30
 "Dancing in the Moonlight (It's Caught Me in Its Spotlight)" (Lynott) - 3:22

Recording dates
 Track 1 recorded on 14/11/72
 Tracks 2–3 recorded on 29/5/75
 Tracks 4–6 recorded on 12/2/76
 Track 7 recorded on 23/9/76
 Tracks 8–9 recorded on 4/4/74
 Tracks 10–11 recorded on 31/7/73
 Tracks 12–15 recorded on 1/8/77

Recording session details
 14/11/72 at Langham 1, London; producer Tony Wilson, engineer Bob Conduct; for ‘John Peel, Sounds of the Seventies’ 28/11/72
 31/7/73 at Langham 1, London; producer John Walters, engineer unknown; for ‘John Peel, Sounds of the Seventies’ 7/8/73
 4/4/74 at Langham 1, London; producer Tony Wilson, engineer Bill Aitken; for ‘John Peel, Sounds of the Seventies’ 11/4/74
 29/5/75 at Maida Vale 4, London; producer Tony Wilson, engineer Bill Aitken; for ‘John Peel ‘with Top Gear’’ 5/6/75
 12/2/76 at Maida Vale 4, London; producer Tony Wilson, engineer Bill Aitken; for ‘John Peel’ 9/3/76
 23/9/76 at Maida Vale 4, London; producer Tony Wilson, engineer Bill Aitken; for ‘John Peel’ 11/10/76
 1/8/77 at Maida Vale 4, London; producer Tony Wilson, engineer Bill Aitken; for ‘John Peel’ 22/8/77

Personnel
Phil Lynott – bass guitar, vocals
Brian Downey – drums, percussion
Scott Gorham – guitar on tracks 2–7, 12–15
Brian Robertson – guitar on tracks 2–7, 12–15
Eric Bell – guitar on tracks 1, 10–11
Gary Moore – guitar, vocals on tracks 8–9

References

Thin Lizzy
Albums produced by Tony Wilson
Albums produced by John Walters (broadcaster)
1994 live albums
Thin Lizzy live albums